Yuyao North railway station is a railway station on the Hangzhou–Ningbo high-speed railway located in Zhejiang, China.

Railway stations in Zhejiang
Yuyao